This article shows all participating team squads at the 2017 Men's European Volleyball Championship, which will be held in Poland from 	24 August – 3 September 2017.

The following is the Belgian roster in the 2017 Men's European Volleyball Championship.

The following is the Bulgarian roster in the 2017 Men's European Volleyball Championship.

The following is the Czech roster in the 2017 Men's European Volleyball Championship.

The following is the Estonian roster in the 2017 Men's European Volleyball Championship.

The following is the Finnish roster in the 2017 Men's European Volleyball Championship.

The following is the French roster in the 2017 Men's European Volleyball Championship.

The following is the German roster in the 2017 Men's European Volleyball Championship.

The following is the Italian roster in the 2017 Men's European Volleyball Championship.

The following is the Dutch roster in the 2017 Men's European Volleyball Championship.

The following is the Polish roster in the 2017 Men's European Volleyball Championship.

The following is the Russian roster in the 2017 Men's European Volleyball Championship.

The following is the Serbian roster in the 2017 Men's European Volleyball Championship. Serbia achieved a bronze medal.

The following is the Slovak roster in the 2017 Men's European Volleyball Championship.

The following is the Slovenian roster in the 2017 Men's European Volleyball Championship.

The following is the Spanish roster in the 2017 Men's European Volleyball Championship.

The following is the Turkish roster in the 2017 Men's European Volleyball Championship.

References

External links
Official Website

S
E